The northern brushtail possum (Trichosurus arnhemensis) is a nocturnal marsupial inhabiting northern Australia.  The northern brushtail possum is sometimes considered a species, however more often than not is considered a subspecies of the common brushtail possum (Trichosurus vulpecula arnhemensis).

Lifestyle 
Possums are nocturnal in nature, so feed between dawn and dusk. They are territorial creatures and can be found alone or in family groups.

Appearance 
Its fur is a grey in colour, with a white underbelly and pink skin. Unlike its relatives and despite what its name suggests, the northern brushtail possum does not have a bushy tail.

Lifespan and reproduction 
The northern brushtail possum breeds year-round, with a gestation period around 17–18 days and pouch period of 4–5 months. It can live up to 15 years.

Diseases 
Many of the NT possums are found to have contracted a flesh eating bacteria. This causes their faces to be eaten away and often results in blindness. The disease has been widely spread within the possum community, also affecting Ringtail possums. Possums brought into the local RSPCA after contracting the disease are commonly put down. Once the possums contract the sickness they are often found to be more welcoming to humans, and will approach when practical.

Relationship with humans 
The northern brushtail possum is well adapted to rural and urban areas and is sometimes considered a pest when found in high numbers. Like other possums, it is rather tolerant of humans and can sometimes be hand fed, although it is not encouraged, as its claws are quite sharp and can cause infection or disease to humans if scratched.

It is a traditional food source for some Indigenous Australians. In the Kunwinjku language it is known as djebuyh.  According to Reverend P. Nganjmirra, Kunwinjku elder, it tastes "good".  It is cooked in a hole like bandicoot.

Diet 

The northern brushtail possum eats a variety of plant matter, including fruit, leaves, flowers, and seeds. Brushtail possums are known to be tolerant of many plant toxins and can eat tree leaves that other animals find poisonous. Possums also eat insects, moths, grubs, snails, birds’ eggs, and chicks. Many of the possums' favourite foods are unfortunately found in domestic gardens, drawing the possums into residential yards.

References 

Possums
Mammals of the Northern Territory
Mammals of Western Australia
Marsupials of Australia
Mammals described in 1897